Europa Plus is a Russian commercial radio station. It is owned by the European Media Group and started broadcasting on 30 April 1990. It is mainly formatted with Hot AC and Top 40.

Europa Plus began brodcasting in the USSR in 1990.

Europa Plus spans across Russia, Latvia, Belarus, Ukraine, Moldova, Armenia, Georgia, Kazakhstan, Uzbekistan, and Kyrgyzstan. It is a large radio network, broadcasting on more than 230 transmitters and on 2 satellites: Intersputnik Express 6 and Intelsat 904. Europa Plus broadcasts in most towns in Russia. In many towns, Europa Plus has local programming in addition to replaying programming from the main station at 106.2 FM in Moscow.

Europa Plus is home to the international dance programmes "Garage" and "EuroMix" hosted by DJ Suhov, DJ Viper, and DJ Polina. After May 12, 2007, EuroMix and Garage swapped days. EuroMix now broadcasts for 6 hours instead of the original 2 hours.

On May 14, 2007, Europa Plus redesigned their website.

References

External links
Official site
Listen Live
 Frequencies List

Lagardère Active
Radio stations in Russia
Radio stations in Georgia (country)
Radio stations in Kazakhstan
Mass media in Moscow
Russian-language radio stations

Radio stations established in 1990